Jisa-ye Danial (also Romanized as Jīsā-ye Dānīāl; also known as Jīsā) is a village in Kelarabad Rural District, Kelarabad District, Abbasabad County, Mazandaran Province, Iran. At the 2006 census, its population was 172, in 50 families.

References 

Populated places in Abbasabad County